Ecuador has submitted films for the Academy Award for Best International Feature Film on an irregular basis since 2000. The award is handed out annually by the United States Academy of Motion Picture Arts and Sciences to a feature-length motion picture produced outside the United States that contains primarily non-English dialogue. , ten Ecuadorian films have been submitted for the Academy Award for Best Foreign Language Film, and none has yet been nominated for an Oscar.

Submissions
The Academy of Motion Picture Arts and Sciences has invited the film industries of various countries to submit their best film for the Academy Award for Best Foreign Language Film since 1956. The Foreign Language Film Award Committee oversees the process and reviews all the submitted films. Following this, they vote via secret ballot to determine the five nominees for the award. Below is a list of the films that have been submitted by Ecuador for review by the Academy for the award by year and the respective Academy Awards ceremony. Both films were in Spanish.

Ecuador's first submission, Dreams from the Middle of the World, told three stories featuring mysterious woman in rural Ecuador: a Spanish woman suddenly arrives in a small secluded town to give piano lessons, a professor believes a blonde stranger has something to do with a series of strange events, and a vacationing couple confront a native demon-spirit called a guadagnó. Producer Alfredo Marcovici told The New York Times in February 2001 "Here in Ecuador it means a lot to be in the Academy because it is so difficult to make movies here. If [a nomination] happens, it would be like a gift from God..

Ecuador's second submission, Crónicas'', was a thriller about a group of tabloid journalists who journey to Ecuador to investigate a serial killer. The film was set and filmed in Ecuador by an Ecuadorian director, and featured an international cast from the United States (John Leguizamo), Mexico (Damián Alcázar and José María Yazpik), the UK (Alfred Molina) and Spain (Leonor Watling). The film was given a limited US theatrical release, and released on DVD with English subtitles.

See also
List of Academy Award winners and nominees for Best Foreign Language Film
List of Academy Award-winning foreign language films
Cinema of Ecuador

Notes

References

External links
The Official Academy Awards Database
The Motion Picture Credits Database
IMDb Academy Awards Page

Best Foreign Language Film Academy Award submissions by country
Academy Award for Best Foreign Language Film
Lists of films by country of production
Academy Award